Vinogradnoe (Vynohradne, Vinogradnoye) (also known as Savvi) is a village in the Grigoriopol sub-district of Transnistria, Moldova. It is currently under the administration of the breakaway government of the Transnistrian Moldovan Republic.

References

Villages of Transnistria